Louis Auguste Sabatier (22 October 1839 – 12 April 1901), French Protestant theologian, was born at Vallon-Pont-d'Arc, Ardèche and died in Strasbourg. 

He was educated at the Protestant theological faculty of Montauban as well as at the universities of Tübingen and Heidelberg.

After holding the pastorate at Aubenas in Ardèche from 1864 to 1868, he was appointed professor of reformed dogmatics at the Protestant theological faculty of Strasbourg. His markedly French sympathies during the War of 1870 led to his expulsion from Strassburg in 1872. After five years' effort he succeeded in establishing a Protestant Faculty of Theology in Paris (today: Faculté de théologie protestante de Paris) along with Eugène Ménégoz, and became professor and then dean. In 1886, he became a teacher in the newly founded religious science department of the École des Hautes Etudes at the Sorbonne.

His brother, Paul, was a noted theological historian. He is the father of two daughters, Marguerite Chevalley, translator, and Lucie Chevalley. Claude Chevalley, mathematician, is his grandson.

Published works 
Among Louis Auguste Sabatier's chief works were:
 Mémoire sur la notion hébraique de l'Esprit (1879).
 Les origines littéraires et la composition de l'apocalypse de Saint Jean (1888).
 The Vitality of Christian Dogmas and their Power of Evolution (1898).
 Outlines of a philosophy of religion based on psychology and history (1902).
 The Apostle Paul (1903).
 The doctrine of the atonement and its historical evolution; and, Religion and modern culture (1904).
 Religions of Authority and the Religion of the Spirit; translation of Les religions d'autorité de la religion de l'esprit (1904, posthumous), to which his colleague Jean Réville prefixed a short memoir.
These works show Sabatier as "at once an accomplished dialectician and a mystic in the best sense of the word".

References

On his theology
Eugène Ménégoz in Expository Times, xv.30
G. B. Stevens in Hibbert Journal (April 1903)

External links
 

1839 births
1901 deaths
People from Ardèche
19th-century Protestant theologians
19th-century French theologians
French Protestant theologians
Heidelberg University alumni
Academic staff of the University of Paris
Academic staff of the Protestant Faculty of Theology in Paris